Emily St. James (formerly Emily Nicole VanDerWerff; born November 30, 1982) is an American critic, journalist, podcaster, and author. She primarily writes about television. She has written for Vox, The A.V. Club, The Guardian, the Los Angeles Times, Grantland, and Slant, among others.

Education 
St. James graduated from South Dakota State University in 2004 with a Bachelor of Arts, majoring in Journalism. During her time, she wrote for the university's student newspaper, The Collegian.

Career 
From 2009 to 2014, St. James was the TV editor for The A.V. Club, helping to build the TV Club, known for criticism of television shows episode by episode. The TV Club, while led by St. James, has been credited with helping build the online culture of television recaps.

In June 2014, St. James joined Vox as their culture editor, going on to become the Critic at Large. She is also involved in Arden, a true crime parody podcast, as well as running Voxs Primetime, a television history podcast. She was a finalist in the 2015 Online Journalism Awards for her media criticism around horror films, Hillary Clinton's presidential campaign announcement, and her review of Mad Max: Fury Road.

In 2018, St. James and fellow critic Zack Handlen wrote Monsters of the Week: The Complete Critical Companion to The X-Files, which was published by Tor Books.

In July 2020, she spoke out against fellow Vox columnist Matthew Yglesias, following his signing of an open letter published in Harper's Magazine which called for an end to what it described as "illiberalism". After a tweet about her criticism by Jesse Singal, one of the letter's signatories, St. James reported that she'd received death threats.

Since beginning her own podcast, Arden, St. James has become more reluctant to engage in traditional review criticism, instead preferring to write about how a work fits into the larger culture.

St. James has appeared multiple times on The George Lucas Talk Show, including during The George Lucas Talk Show All Day Star Wars Movie Watch Along and The George Lucas Holiday Special.

Personal life 
St. James came out as a transgender woman in 2019. She was interviewed on NPR's Weekend Edition Sunday about her experiences. She is a founding member of the Trans Journalists Association and helped create its style guide, a resource for other journalists to more accurately write about transgender people and issues.

She has been married to writer Libby Hill since 2003. She changed her last name from VanDerWerff to St. James in January 2022, although initially only on a personal, rather than professional, basis.

References

External links
  at vox.com
 Episodes An Emily St. James Subscription Newsletter
 Arden Podcast
 

American writers
1982 births
Living people
Transgender women
American LGBT journalists
LGBT people from South Dakota
Journalists from South Dakota
South Dakota State University alumni
Transgender writers